BBC Wildlife is a British glossy, all-colour magazine about wildlife, operated and published by Immediate Media Company. It produces 13 issues a year.

BBC Wildlife was launched in January 1963 as Animals Magazine, edited by filmmaker Armand Denis. In 1974 the magazine was renamed Wildlife, and in November 1983 the magazine joined BBC Magazines as BBC Wildlife.

From 1981, and for 23 years, it was edited by Rosamund Kidman Cox. In May 2004, BBC Wildlife moved to Origin Publishing, which became Immediate Media, and Sophie Stafford took over the editorship after working as a section editor for two years. In 2013, Matt Swaine took over the reins, followed  by Sheena Harvey in 2015. The current Editor, Paul McGuinness, took over in May 2019.

Editions are now numbered such that the January 2005 edition was volume 23, number 1.

Regular contributors
Regular columnists include:
Mark Carwardine
Nick Baker
Mike Dilger (The One Show presenter)

Regular writers include:
Chris Packham
Amy-Jane Beer
Stuart Blackman
Mike Unwin
Mark Eveleigh
Tim Birkhead
Patrick Barkham
Helen Scales
Stephen Moss

References

External links
Official website
BBC press release – new editor appointed

1963 establishments in the United Kingdom
BBC publications
Magazines established in 1963
Magazines published in London
Monthly magazines published in the United Kingdom
Science and technology magazines published in the United Kingdom
Wildlife of the United Kingdom
Wildlife magazines